Ryan Hawkins (born May 12, 1997) is an American professional basketball player for Raptors 905 of the NBA G League. He played college basketball for the Northwest Missouri State Bearcats and the Creighton Bluejays.

High school career
Hawkins played basketball for Atlantic High School in Atlantic, Iowa. As a senior, he averaged 22.2 points, 13.4 rebounds, 3.9 steals and 2.7 assists per game. Hawkins was named Western Iowa Male Athlete of the Year by the Omaha World-Herald. He played five other sports in high school for at least two years: track and field, soccer, baseball, football and cross country. Hawkins originally committed to playing college basketball for Wayne State in Nebraska, but due to a coaching change, he switched his commitment to Northwest Missouri State.

College career
After redshirting his first year at Northwest Missouri State, in which the team won the NCAA Division II national title, Hawkins averaged 5.4 points and 3.5 rebounds per game as a freshman. In his sophomore season, he helped his team achieve a 38–0 record and win the national championship. Hawkins averaged 13.9 points and 8.9 rebounds per game, earning Second Team All-Mid-America Intercollegiate Athletics Association (MIAA) and Defensive Player of the Year honors. He broke the program single-season rebounding record. 

On November 2, 2019, Hawkins scored a school-record 44 points with nine rebounds in a 100–88 win against Southern Nazarene. As a junior, he averaged 22.7 points, 7.4 rebounds and 2.1 steals per game, and received First Team All-MIAA and Defensive Player of the Year recognition. On March 5, 2021, during his senior season, Hawkins posted the first triple-double in MIAA Tournament history, contributing 30 points, 11 rebounds and 11 assists in a 104–72 semifinal win over Central Oklahoma. He led Northwest Missouri State to a national title and was named Elite Eight Most Outstanding Player. As a senior, Hawkins averaged 22.6 points and 8.8 rebounds per game. He was a First Team All-America selection by D2CCA, and earned First Team All-MIAA honors. Hawkins left Northwest Missouri State with the most rebounds and the second-most points, steals and three-pointers in program history.

Hawkins used his additional year of college eligibility granted due to the COVID-19 pandemic, and transferred to Creighton. On February 12, 2022, he scored a season-high 30 points and had 12 rebounds in an 80–66 win against Georgetown. Hawkins was named to the Second Team All-Big East.

Professional career
After going undrafted in the 2022 NBA draft, Hawkins played for the Golden State Warriors and Toronto Raptors in the 2022 NBA Summer League. He was added to the roster of the Raptors’ NBA G League affiliate, Raptors 905.

Career statistics

College

|-
| style="text-align:left;"| 2016–17
| style="text-align:left;"| Northwest Missouri State
| style="text-align:center;" colspan="11"|  Redshirt
|-
| style="text-align:left;"| 2017–18
| style="text-align:left;"| Northwest Missouri State
| 31 || 0 || 19.0 || .413 || .337 || .720 || 3.5 || .3 || .6 || .2 || 5.4
|-
| style="text-align:left;"| 2018–19
| style="text-align:left;"| Northwest Missouri State
| 38 || 38 || 34.5 || .515 || .365 || .878 || 8.9 || 1.0 || 2.2 || .7 || 13.9
|-
| style="text-align:left;"| 2019–20
| style="text-align:left;"| Northwest Missouri State
| 32 || 32 || 34.6 || .561 || .454 || .807 || 7.4 || 1.8 || 2.1 || .8 || 22.7
|-
| style="text-align:left;"| 2020–21
| style="text-align:left;"| Northwest Missouri State
| 30 || 30 || 35.4 || .540 || .460 || .763 || 8.8 || 2.4 || 1.8 || .3 || 22.6
|-
| style="text-align:left;"| 2021-22
| style="text-align:left;"| Creighton University
| 35 || 35 || 35.0 || .437 || .358 || .800 || 7.8 || 1.51 || 0.91 || .37 || 13.8
|- class="sortbottom"
| style="text-align:center;" colspan="2"| Career
| 166 || 135 || 31.9 || .508 || .398 || .80 || 7.3 || 1.4 || 1.5 || .5 || 15.5

Personal life
Hawkins' sister, Jessica, played basketball for Simpson College. His aunt, Deanna Winder, played basketball and softball for Cornell College.

References

External links
Creighton Bluejays bio
Northwest Missouri State Bearcats bio

1997 births
Living people
American expatriate basketball people in Canada
American men's basketball players
Basketball players from Iowa
Creighton Bluejays men's basketball players
Northwest Missouri State Bearcats men's basketball players
People from Atlantic, Iowa
Power forwards (basketball)
Raptors 905 players